Frank Purcell (died 2 April 1960) was an Irish politician and trade union official. He served as General Secretary of the ITGWU in 1948. He was an independent member of Seanad Éireann from 1954 to 1960. He was first elected to the 8th Seanad in 1954 by the Labour Panel. He was re-elected at the 1957 election but died in office in 1960. Edward Browne was elected to fill the vacancy.

References

Year of birth missing
1960 deaths
Irish trade unionists
Members of the 8th Seanad
Members of the 9th Seanad
Independent members of Seanad Éireann